Rådhuspladsen station (lit. City Hall Square) is an underground Copenhagen Metro station located on City Hall Square in central Copenhagen, Denmark. The station is on the City Circle Line (M3 and M4), between Gammel Strand and Copenhagen Central Station, and is in fare zone 1.

Nearby landmarks include Copenhagen City Hall, the southwestern end of Strøget, Tivoli Gardens,  the National Museum of Denmark and the Ny Carlsberg Glyptotek 9.

History 
Construction on Rådhuspladsen station began in 2009. It is opened on 29 September 2019 along with the rest of the City Circle Line. During the station's construction, a work site took over the western half of the square to allow for excavation and station shell construction.

Design
The main staircase is located adjacent to Vester Voldgade and faces the tower of the Coty Hall. A secondary staircase faces H. C. Andersens Boulevard. The escalator shaft is clad with black, ceramic panels.

Transport links
Bus routes 10, 12, 14, 26, 33, 2A, 6A, 5V, 250S, 93N, 94N and 97N serve the station.

Service

References

External links 
  Rådhuspladsen station official site

City Circle Line (Copenhagen Metro) stations
M4 (Copenhagen Metro) stations
Railway stations opened in 2019
2019 establishments in Denmark
Railway stations in Denmark opened in the 21st century